The Palmer River is a river in the U.S. states of Massachusetts and Rhode Island. It flows approximately 17 km (11 mi).

Course
The river has two separate branches which converge near the intersection of Danforth Street and Winthrop Street (U.S. 44) in Rehoboth, Massachusetts to form the main branch of the river.

West branch
The west branch (officially West Branch Palmer River) rises in a small unnamed pond near the eastern intersection of Tremont Street and Agricultural Avenue in Rehoboth. It continues roughly south from here until converging with the east branch. It flows approximately 9 km (5 mi).

East branch
The east branch (officially East Branch Palmer River) rises in Little Cedar Swamp in North Rehoboth and flows roughly southwest to converge with the west branch. It flows approximately 8 km (5 mi).

Main branch
After the two branches converge, the river flows roughly south-southwest through Rehoboth and Swansea before crossing into Rhode Island and flowing between Barrington and Warren for its last few miles. At its mouth, it converges with the Barrington River to form the Warren River.

Crossings
Below is a list of all crossings over the Palmer River and its branches. The list begins at the headwaters and goes downstream.

West branch
Rehoboth
Fairfield Street
Ash Street
Homestead Avenue
Perryville Road
Danforth Street
Carpenter Street

East branch
Rehoboth
Fairview Avenue
Williams Street
Winthrop Street (U.S. 44)
Moulton Street (MA 118)
County Street (Twice)
Winthrop Street (U.S. 44)

Main branch
Rehoboth
Danforth Street
Winthrop Street (U.S. 44)
Wilmarth Bridge Road
Summer Street
Wheeler Street
Reed Street
Providence Street
Interstate 195
Fall River Avenue (U.S. 6)
Swansea
Old Providence Road
Barrington
County Road (RI 103/114)

Tributaries
In addition to many unnamed tributaries, the following brooks feed the Palmer and its branches:
Mine Brook (West Branch)
Bliss Brook (West Branch)
Wolf Plain Brook (West Branch)
Carpenter Brook (West Branch)
Roaring Brook (East Branch)
Bad Luck Brook (East Branch)
Rumney Marsh Brook
Fullers Brook
Rocky Run
Torrey Creek

Eponym 
The river was probably named for Walter Palmer, one of the founders of Rehoboth.

Depiction in art 

The Palmer River is a subject of an 1885 painting by local artist Edward Mitchell Bannister.

See also
List of rivers in Massachusetts
List of rivers in Rhode Island

References
Maps from the United States Geological Survey

Rivers of Bristol County, Massachusetts
Rivers of Bristol County, Rhode Island
Narragansett Bay
Rivers of Massachusetts
Rivers of Rhode Island